The Arzac was a small French cyclecar manufactured in Paris from 1926 to 1927.  Made by Gabriel Arzac from Bergerac Dordogne. The automobile featured front-wheel drive, independent suspension on all wheels, and either a 483 cc or a 500 cc two-stroke engine.

Vintage vehicles
Defunct motor vehicle manufacturers of France
Cyclecars